Aayutha Ezhuthu is a 2004 Indian Tamil-language political action film written and directed by Mani Ratnam. It is loosely based on the life story of George Reddy, a scholar from Osmania University of Hyderabad. It stars Suriya in the lead role, with an ensemble supporting cast. Bharathiraja appears in another pivotal role. This is the Tamil debut of Bollywood actress Esha Deol and remains the only Tamil film she has ever acted in. The title of the movie was taken from the name of a Tamil letter, ஃ – three dots corresponding to the film's three different personalities from completely different strata of society.

The film's score and soundtrack were composed by A. R. Rahman, while Ravi K. Chandran was the cinematographer and Sreekar Prasad was the editor. The film was simultaneously shot in Hindi as Yuva with an entirely different cast retaining Deol. The film was produced by Ratnam's home banner, Madras Talkies, and was released on 21 May 2004.

Plot
The film begins with Inba Sekar shooting Michael “Mike” Vasanth on his bike, resulting in him falling off the Napier Bridge into the water below which is witnessed by Arjun Balakrishnan. The flashback of the characters before the incident then unveils.

InbaSekar grew up to be a goon as his brother Gunasekaran had left him to fend for himself, and he had no option of earning. He loves, marries, and abuses his wife Sashi. He gets into a contract under Guna's recommendation to run errands and work as a hitman for Selvanayagam, a politician.

Michael is an influential student leader who wants politicians like Selvanayagam to keep away from college elections. Michael is in love with his neighbour Geetha, who lives with her uncle and aunt. Selvanayagam is worried when he hears news of students standing in the election. He uses every possible tactic to get them out of politics. Firstly, he provides a scholarship to study at a prestigious foreign university to Michael. When Michael refuses the bribe, Inba takes control under Guna's orders. Inba beats some students but faces very strong retaliation from Michael and other students. Inba and his thug friend Dilli meet Michael face-to-face and fall into a tussle after Inba threatens the latter to leave politics.

Arjun Balakrishnan is the carefree and spoiled son of an IAS officer. He wants to relocate to the US for a better future. He falls in love with Meera, whom he just met. One day, Arjun proposes to Meera on the road, and she gets into an auto while telling him to prove it, playfully. Arjun hitches a ride from Michael, who is riding in the same direction, to catch up with Meera. Suddenly, Michael is shot with three rounds fired by Inba, but Arjun saves him. Critically injured, Michael is rushed to the hospital by Meera and Arjun.

Inba finds out that Michael is recovering from his injuries and this is witnessed by Arjun, who follows him to apprehend him, only for Inba to beat him up badly and leave him with a broken arm. After staying by his side until his recovery, Arjun changes his mind and joins hands with Michael to contest in elections. Inba later kills Guna when he finds out that he had been instructed by Selvanayagam to take him out due to Inba leaving an eyewitness, Arjun, behind the bridge incident. He confronts Selvanayagam, who brainwashes him to work for him and orders him to kidnap Arjun, Suchi, and Trilok. However, they escape with the help of Dilli, who has a change of heart after realising that their profession was interfering with their personal lives, causing Sashi to leave Inba for her hometown. He convinces Inba, however to no avail, and is killed by him when he aids Arjun's escape.

While running, Arjun calls Michael for help, but Inba easily catches up and thrashes him. Michael arrives in the nick of time to rescue Arjun at the Napier Bridge. A fight ensues between the three men, where Inba is overpowered by Michael, who spares him and leaves him for the police. Inba is handed over to the police and jailed. Michael, Arjun, Suchi, and Trilok win the four seats they had contested for and thus enter into politics.

Cast

Production

The film began pre-production in early 2003 in a typical manner adapted by the director, Mani Ratnam, who keeps his projects under wraps until completion. The director chose to make two different versions of the film as he did not want the film to be dubbed, explaining that the essence of the script would be lost if they had done so. The project was named Aayitha Ezhuthu after the last letter of the Tamil alphabet, which is denoted by three dots in a triangle and the director revealed that the film was about three individuals. Early reports indicated that the film would be based on the 2000 neorealist Mexican film, Amores perros by Alejandro González Iñárritu, but eventually only the idea of hyperlink cinema was common in both films. However, Mani Ratnam revealed that the film was closer to Akira Kurosawa's 1950 Japanese film Rashomon as both films dealt with a cause-effect and a third-view called Rashomon effect.

Suriya, who made his debut in the 1997 Mani Ratnam production Nerukku Ner, revealed that he agreed "blindly" to star in the film without even listening to the story or his character. The actor revealed in an interview about Mani Ratnam's choice that "when the master calls for the student you just say “yes”." Suriya stated that his character was based on a real person George Reddy from Andhra Pradesh and to prepare, he read a lot of books and collected a lot of information before the shoot. R. Madhavan was signed on to appear in Mani Ratnam's fourth successive project after playing the lead roles in his Alaipayuthey (2000) and Kannathil Muthamittal (2002) as well as his 2001 production, Dumm Dumm Dumm. The actor bulked up and sported a shaven look for the first time in his career to resemble his character of a ruffian. Initially, actor Vikram was considered to do the role of Madhavan, but unable to sign in due to his other commitments. For a third lead role, Mani Ratnam called Srikanth and requested him to audition for the project in December 2002. The actor had scored back-to-back successes in his first two films, Roja Koottam and April Madhathil, and was subsequently selected to be a part of the film. However, the actor soon after suffered an injury and was unable to commit to the dates Mani Ratnam suggested. Shaam was next approached for the role of Arjun, but date clashes with Iyarkai, meant that he was unable to sign the project. Karthi, the brother of Suriya, was then offered the role but declined the offer to make his debut and worked as an assistant director on the film because he wanted to become a film director and preferred directing to acting. Siddharth, who had previously apprenticed as an assistant director under Mani Ratnam in Kannathil Muthamittal before his making his acting debut in Shankar's Boys, was subsequently signed on for the film. Prior to release, Siddharth felt he was cast as he "looked, talked and behaved like Arjun" and mentioned that the sync sound technique used worked in favour of him as he was an experienced theatre actor. Veteran director Bharathiraja was signed on to play a politician in the film, while Sriman and Janagaraj were given supporting roles. Leading Kannada actor Sudeep was also initially slated to form a part of the cast after meeting Mani Ratnam for the script discussion, but was ultimately discarded from the film. Krishna and Suchitra, a singer and radio jockey, also were chosen to play the roles of student leaders in the film.

Malayalam actress Meera Jasmine was signed on to play a slum dweller in the film portraying Madhavan's wife and it was reported that she spent hours perfecting her Tamil for the film, trying to get rid of her native Malayalam accent to adapt to the sound sync technique used. Relative newcomer Trisha was also signed on to play a youngster in the film and dubbed for her own voice for the first time. Initially Simran was signed on to play the roles of Geetanjali in both versions, but opted out after she began to have problems speaking Tamil as the sound for the film was recorded live. Esha Deol, daughter of actress Hema Malini, was then selected to play the role in the Tamil version of the film after Suhasini enquired whether she could speak Tamil. After finishing her work in Aaytha Ezhuthu, Deol was signed on for the Hindi version of the film too after Simran also opted out of that role and thus Deol became the only common leading actor between the versions. To prepare for her role, Deol worked on certain pronunciations of Iyer Tamil with Mani Ratnam's assistant Kannan mentoring her progress. It was also reported that actress Nadhiya had signed the film and would make a comeback to films after a ten-year sabbatical but did not eventually form a part of the final cast.

The director initially opted against using songs in the film but wanted to create an album with A. R. Rahman for the project. However, after the songs were recorded, Mani Ratnam had a change of heart and chose to include them. For the art direction in the film, Sabu Cyril studied each character in-depth, giving them a distinct colour, mood, and background to suit their temperament. For Michael's house in the film, Cyril followed the arrangement in his own house and used some of his own photographs for decorations. He also expressed that he had great difficulty in re-creating the streets of Kolkata for the Hindi version of the film in Chennai. G. Ramesh was selected to be the hairdresser for the three lead actors in the film.

The scene filmed at Napier Bridge in Chennai was canned in early December 2003, causing severe traffic and congestion in the area. Mani Ratnam began the Tamil version after Vivek Oberoi suffered an injury during the making of Yuva, giving him time to extract more out his actors in the Tamil version. Production work for the film began in September 2003, with the technical crew who were mostly from the Tamil film industry including the production house were part of the Hindi version and were retained for the Tamil scenes. The Tamil version finished subsequently much earlier than the Hindi version. Some scenes featuring Suriya were also shot at the University of Madras, Mani Ratnam's alma mater.

Soundtrack

Release and reception
The satellite rights of the film's Tamil version were sold to Kalaignar TV. The film was also dubbed in Telugu under the title Yuva.

Aayutha Ezuthu received positive reviews. Indiaglitz wrote: "Worth watching". Nowrunning rated the film 4 out of 5. Sify wrote: "Aayitha Ezhuthu is a bold and daring move by Mani Ratnam to change the staid style of our commercial cinema". The Hindu wrote: "Every frame of Madras Talkies' "Aayudha Ezhuthu" bears the Mani Ratnam stamp and that's what matters. If silence and secrecy can stoke up interest, it has. And again, if the stature of a director can hype up a project, it has". Visual Dasan of Kalki wrote that the usual exuberance that permeates Mani Ratnam's films is also present in Ayudha Ezhuthu but there is no intensity in the flood; only the murmur of the stream.

See also 
 Hyperlink cinema - the film style of using multiple inter-connected story lines.
 Yuva (2004) - the simultaneously made Hindi version of the film

References

External links
 

2004 films
Hyperlink films
Indian nonlinear narrative films
Films directed by Mani Ratnam
Films set in Chennai
2000s Tamil-language films
Films scored by A. R. Rahman
2000s political drama films
Indian political drama films
Indian multilingual films
2004 multilingual films